The  Eastern League season began on approximately April 1 and the regular season ended on approximately September 1. 

The Harrisburg Senators defeated the Portland Sea Dogs 3 games to 1 to win the Eastern League Championship Series.

Regular season

Standings

Notes:
Green shade indicates that team advanced to the playoffs
Bold indicates that team advanced to ELCS
Italics indicates that team won ELCS

Playoffs

Divisional Series

Northern Division
The Portland Sea Dogs defeated the Norwich Navigators in the Northern Division playoffs 3 games to 2.

Southern Division
The Harrisburg Senators defeated the Bowie Baysox in the Southern Division playoffs 3 games to 2.

Championship series
The Harrisburg Senators defeated the Portland Sea Dogs in the ELCS 3 games to 1.

References

External links
1997 Eastern League Review at thebaseballcube.com

Eastern League seasons